Reena Choudhary (born. 2 June 1968) is a political and social worker and a member of parliament elected from the Mohanlalganj constituency in the Indian state of Uttar Pradesh and has been a Samajwadi Party candidate.

Early life
Reena was born on 2 June 1968 to Shri Bhagwati Prasad and Smt. Chandra Wati in Gorakhpur, Uttar Pradesh. She is married and has a son.

Education
Reena finished her education from Banasthali Vidyapith(Rajasthan) and Lucknow University. Reena completed her Master of Arts and LL.B.

Career
Reena is an artist.
Reena was elected to 12th Lok Sabha in 1998. During 1998–99, she served as
 Member on the Committee of Defence and its Sub-Committee-II. 
 Member, Committee on Provision of Computers to members of parliament
 Member, Consultative Committee, Ministry of Steel and Mines
In 1999, she was re-elected to the 13th Lok Sabha for a 2nd term. During 1999–2000, she served as
 Member, Committee on Transport and Tourism
 Member, Committee on Provision of Computers to members of parliament
During 2000–2004, she was also a Member on the Consultative Committee, Ministry of Civil Aviation.

In 2004, she was denied a party ticket and hence resigned from the primary membership of the party. She also alleged that Samajwadi Party compromised with the interests of the people of the area by forcing an outsider in the constituency. She claimed that two other senior party leaders Jawahar Jaiswal from Chandauli and Dharam Raj Patel from Phoolpur – both sitting members of the dissolved Lok Sabha, were also unhappy over denial of tickets.

In 2002, Reena suffered 15% burns due to an accident at her residence. The police officials believed that the fire was caused by a leak in the pipe connecting the LPG cylinder and the cooking range.

References

1968 births
India MPs 1999–2004
Women in Uttar Pradesh politics
Articles created or expanded during Women's History Month (India) - 2014
Living people
Lok Sabha members from Uttar Pradesh
21st-century Indian women politicians
21st-century Indian politicians
20th-century Indian women politicians
20th-century Indian politicians
People from Gorakhpur
India MPs 1998–1999
People from Lucknow district